Katharina Scholz (born 4 July 1983 in Berlin) is a German field hockey player who competed in the 2008 Summer Olympics.

Scholz posed nude in the German edition of Playboy in August 2008, alongside compatriots Nicole Reinhardt, Petra Niemann and Romy Tarangul.

References

External links
 

1983 births
Living people
Field hockey players from Berlin
German female field hockey players
Olympic field hockey players of Germany
Field hockey players at the 2008 Summer Olympics
21st-century German women